Nasser is a masculine given name, commonly found in the Arabic and Persian languages. Alternative spellings of this name, possibly due to transliteration include Naser, Nassar, Nasir, Naseer, or Nacer. People with this name may include:

Given name
 Nassar (born 1958), Tamil actor and director, sometimes spelled Nasser
 Nasser al-Bahri (1972–2015), Al Qaeda militant
 Nasser Beydoun, American business executive 
Nasser Fahimi (born 1974), political and ideological prisoner from Iran
 Nasser Abu Hamid (1972–2022), Palestinian politician
 Nasser Hussain (born 1968), former England cricket captain
 Nasser Judeh (born 1961) Jordanian politician
 Nasser Kanaani (born 1970), Iranian diplomat
 Nasser bin Hamad Al Khalifa (born 1987), Bahraini royal
 Nasser Khalili (born 1945), British-Iranian collector, scholar and philanthropist
 Nasser Al-Khelaifi (born 1973), Qatari businessman
 Nasser Meftah (born 1995), Qatari football player
 Nasser Minachi (1931–2014), Iranian politician
 Nasser bin Zayed Al Nahyan (died 2008), Emirati royal
 Nasser Al Qasabi (born 1961), Saudi Arabian actor
 Nasser Al Saeed (1923–unknown), Saudi Arabian missing dissident since 1979
 Nasser bin Abdulaziz Al Saud (1911–1984), Saudi royal
 Nasser Al-Shamrani (born 1983), Saudi Arabian footballer
 Nasser El Sonbaty (1965-2013), German bodybuilder 
 Nasser Yeganeh (1921–1993), Iranian jurist and politician

Middle name/father name
 Abdul Nasser El Hakim (born 1960), Lebanese-born Curaçaoan businessman, politician, minister and a founder of the political party Movement for the Future of Curaçao (MFK)
 Amal Nasser el-Din, (born 1928), Druze Israeli author and former politician, former MP in the Knesset (Israeli Parliament)
 Ammar Abadah Nasser al-Wa'eli (1977–2011), Yemeni wanted for terrorism by the FBI
 Bashir Ali Nasser al-Sharari (born 1970), Yemeni who became briefly wanted in 2002, by the United States Department of Justice's FBI in connection with terrorism
 Fadel Nasser Sarouf, (born Valentin Sarov in 1976), Bulgarian-Qatari weightlifter
 Hussein ibn Nasser (1902–1982), Prime Minister of Jordan from 1963 to 1964
 Hussein Nasser Al-Huraiti, Kuwaiti politician and MP in its National Assembly
 Hussein Nasser Walji (1920–2005), Tanzanian politician 
 Mansour Nasser al Bihani, Yemeni fighter who died in Somalia in 2011
 Mohammed Nasser Ahmed, Yemeni major general and government minister

Surname
 Abdelkarim Hussein Mohamed Al-Nasser, alleged terrorist from Saudi Arabia
 Amin H. Nasser, Saudi Arabian engineer
 Farah Nasser, Canadian journalist
 Fredy Nasser (born 1956), Honduran businessman
 Hana Nasser (born 1991), Israeli football player
 Hanna Nasser (1936–2015), Palestinian politician
 Hanna Nasser (academic), Palestinian academic and political figure 
 Jacques Nasser (born 1947), former CEO of Ford Motor Company
 Jorge Nasser (born 1956), Uruguayan musician
 Larry Nassar (born 1963), former US gymnastics osteopathic physician who sexually abused and raped over 70 women in his career
 Latif Nasser (born 1986), American Canadian writer

See also
 Nasser (disambiguation)
 Gamal Abdel Nasser (disambiguation)

References

External links
 

Arabic-language surnames
Arabic masculine given names